Assara conicolella is a species of snout moth in the genus Assara. It was described by Alexandre Constant in 1884 and is known from France, Corsica and the Iberian Peninsula.

The wingspan is 13–17 mm.

References

Moths described in 1884
Phycitini
Moths of Europe